The House of Ponce de León was an important aristocratic family in León in Spain during the middle ages.

It arose from the marriage of Pedro Ponce de Cabrera and Aldonza Alfonso de León, illegitimate daughter of King Alfonso IX of Leon.

The house held several important titles in the peerage of Spain, including the dukedoms of Arcos, Aveyro, Cádiz and Nájera.

Notable members
Juan Ponce de León
Juan Ponce de León II
Juan Ponce de León y Loayza
Luis Ponce de León
Pedro Ponce de León the Elder
Rodrigo Ponce de León, 4th Duke of Arcos
Rodrigo Ponce de León, Duke of Cádiz
Antonio Ponce de León, 11th Duke of Arcos

Sources
Salazar y Acha, Jaime de (1985). Una Familia de la Alta Edad Media: Los Velas y su Realidad Histórica (en Estudios Genealógicos y Heráldicos). Asociación Española de Estudios Genealógicos y Heráldicos. p. 52. 

History of Spain